PSQ or psq may refer to:

 Political Science Quarterly, an American double blind peer-reviewed academic journal
 PSQ, the IATA code for Philadelphia Seaplane Base, Essington, Pennsylvania, United States
 psq, the ISO 639-3 code for Pasi language, Sandaun Province, Papua New Guinea